India Fly Safe Aviation is an Indian charter airline based in New Delhi.

History
The airline was established in late 1997 as Shri Venkatesh Aviation after the Open Skies policy was adopted in 1991. The airline currently offers charter services to both domestic and international destinations using jet and propeller aircraft.

Fleet
The airline operates the following aircraft as of June 2018:

Retired fleet
The airline operated these aircraft over the years of its operation:

Beechcraft Super King Air-200
Eurocopter EC120
Eurocopter EC130
Eurocopter EC145
Pilatus PC-12

References

Airlines of India
Airlines established in 1997
Indian companies established in 1997
1997 establishments in Delhi
Companies based in Delhi